Harold Ancart (born 1980) is a Belgian painter and sculptor. He currently lives and works in New York City.

Education
Harold Ancart studied at La Cambre in Brussels, Belgium where he received a M.F.A in 2007.

Major works

"Untitled (the great night)" – Painting the night – Group Show at Centre Pompidou-Metz, France (2018)
Harold Ancart created a 15 by 44 feet site-specific painting for the Shigeru Ban designed front window of the Centre Pompidou-Metz during the group show "Painting the Night" that was shown from October 13, 2018, to April 15, 2019.

"Subliminal Standard" – Public Art Fund project in Brooklyn, New York (2019)
He painted a freestanding, 16-foot-high concrete sculpture paying tribute to handball courts in Cadman Plaza, Brooklyn with the support of Public Art Fund that will be on view from May 1, 2019 to March 1, 2020.

Shows

Collections
Harold Ancart's work is held in the following public collections:
Whitney Museum of American Art, New York
Solomon R. Guggenheim Museum, New York
Los Angeles County Museum of Art, Los Angeles
Beyeler Foundation, Basel
Musée d'Art Moderne de la Ville de Paris, Paris
National Gallery of Canada, Ottawa
Louis Vuitton Foundation, Paris
Menil Collection, Houston
Hirshhorn Museum and Sculpture Garden, Washington DC
Museum of Contemporary Art, Los Angeles
Albright–Knox Art Gallery, Buffalo
Louisiana Museum of Modern Art, Copenhagen
Lenbachhaus, Munich
Stedelijk Museum voor Actuele Kunst, Ghent
K11 Art Foundation, Hong Kong
Yuz Museum Shanghai, Shanghai

References

External links
 "How the Self-Deprecating Belgian Painter Harold Ancart Charmed the Art World" Article by Artnet, September 2018
 "Meet the Art World’s Rising Stars" Article by WSJ, June 2019
 "Back and forth with artist Harold Ancart" Article by Cultured Magazine, April 2019
 "How Small-Scale Paintings Became the Art World's Big New Trend" Article by Vogue, August 2016
 "Harold Ancart – Artforum" Review by Artforum, 2015
 "Harold Ancart – Frieze" Review by Frieze, 2015

20th-century Belgian sculptors
1980 births
Living people
21st-century Belgian painters
Belgian contemporary artists
21st-century Belgian sculptors
20th-century Belgian painters
Belgian expatriates in the United States